El Guijo is a city located in the province of Córdoba, Spain. According to the 2006 census (INE), the city has a population of 404 inhabitants.  It was donated by Fernando III in 1231 and confirmed by Alfonso X as a donation in 1256.

References

External links
El Guijo - Sistema de Información Multiterritorial de Andalucía

Municipalities in the Province of Córdoba (Spain)